Branchiostoma is one of the few living genera of lancelets (order Amphioxiformes). It is the type genus of family Branchiostomatidae.

These small vaguely eel- or snake-like animals are close relatives of vertebrates. The scientific name means "gill-mouth", referring to their anatomy – unlike vertebrates, they do not have a true head (with a skull capsule, eyes, nose, a well-developed brain etc.), but merely a mouth adjacent to the gill-slits, with the slightly enlarged anterior end of the dorsal nerve cord above and in front of them. It dislikes the light.

Like all lancelets, they are filter feeders that hide in the sediment most of the time. The genus inhabits coastal waters throughout the world.

Species
 Branchiostoma africae Hubbs, 1927
 Branchiostoma arabiae Webb, 1957
 Branchiostoma bazarutense Gilchrist, 1923
 Branchiostoma belcheri Gray, 1847 (Belcher's lancelet)
 Branchiostoma bennetti Boschung & Gunter, 1966 (Mud lancelet)
 Branchiostoma bermudae Hubbs, 1922
 Branchiostoma californiense Andrews, 1893 (Californian lancelet)
 Branchiostoma capense Gilchrist, 1902
 Branchiostoma caribaea Sundevall, 1853 (Caribbean lancelet)
 Branchiostoma clonasea  
 Branchiostoma elongata Sundevall, 1852
 Branchiostoma floridae Hubbs, 1922 (Florida lancelet)
 Branchiostoma gambiense Webb, 1958
 Branchiostoma indica Willey, 1901
 Branchiostoma japonica Willey, 1896  (Pacific lancelet)
 Branchiostoma lanceolatum Pallas, 1774 (European lancelet)
 Branchiostoma leonense Webb, 1956
 Branchiostoma longirostra Boschung, 1983 (Shellhash lancelet)
 Branchiostoma malayana Webb, 1956
 Branchiostoma moretonense Kelly, 1966; nomen dubium
 Branchiostoma nigeriense Webb, 1955
 Branchiostoma platae Hubbs, 1922
 Branchiostoma senegalense Webb, 1955
 Branchiostoma tattersalli Hubbs, 1922
 Branchiostoma virginiae Hubbs, 1922 (Virginian lancelet)

References

External links
 
 Branchiostoma

Cephalochordata
Taxa named by Oronzio Gabriele Costa
Chordate genera